Soquelec limited is a Montreal-based company that focuses on sales and service of scientific equipment for applications in materials and life sciences. It is the Canadian distributor of manufacturers of digital imaging technology and accessories, such as Electron Microscopy, Atomic Force Microscopy, X-Ray scanning and sample preparation. It is also a provider of laboratory consumables. Its sister company, Soquelec Telecommunications, specializes in the distribution of RF, microwave and millimeter-wave telecommunication components.

History
Soquelec was founded in 1974 by Jean-Pierre and Yette Slakmon. It has continuously operated in the Canadian market and has been involved in the installation of over 200 electron optical systems in universities, hospitals and private companies.

Upon the death of its founder in 2015 the management of the company has passed on Jean-Pierre's son Marc.

For over 35 years, Soquelec was the exclusive distributor of JEOL (Japan Electron Optics Laboratory) in Canada.

Representation
As of April 2016 Soquelec is the Canadian distributor of the following manufacturers:

Annealsys (RTP and CVD)
Bruker (limited to x-ray products)
Gatan (CCD cameras, image filters, TEM sample holders, sample preparation equipment)
Haskris (water chillers)
IDES (time-resolved TEM)
Nanosensors (AFM tips)
NanoWorld (AFM tips)
Quorum (EM sample preparation and cryo equipment)
RMC Boekeler (Ultramicrotomes and EM sample preparation equipment)
TESCAN (electron microscopes)

References

External links

Companies based in Montreal
Canadian companies established in 1974
1974 establishments in Quebec
Technology companies of Canada